Kalman Yeger (born April 26, 1974) is an American politician who serves in the New York City Council for the 44th district. He is a member of the Democratic Party. The district includes all or parts of the Bensonhurst, Borough Park, Gravesend, Kensington, and Midwood neighborhoods in Brooklyn.

Early life and education
Yeger is a graduate of Touro College with a B.A. degree and New York Law School with a J.D. degree in 2011.

Career
Yeger began his career as a community liaison and assistant to New York City Councilman Lloyd Henry he then went on to work for Fernando Ferrer as a top advisor. In 2010, he began working as senior advisor and counsel to New York City Councilman David G. Greenfield.

Yeger has been a member of Brooklyn Community Board 14 since 2000.

City Council
Outgoing council person David G. Greenfield tapped Yeger, his counsel, to run for his council seat in 2017, as Greenfield decided not to run for re-election, instead taking over the helm of New York's largest Jewish charity, the Metropolitan Council on Jewish Poverty. Opposing Yeger, was Yoni Hikind, the son of New York State Assemblyman Dov Hikind, whose district covers much of the same constituency.

Yeger defeated Hikind, 67%–29%.

Yeger currently serves on the following New York City Council committees:

 Contracts
 Environmental Protection
 Governmental Operations
 Oversight and Investigation
 Technology

Controversy
On March 26, 2019, Yeger accused Democratic Minnesota Congresswoman Ilhan Omar of being an antisemite because of her comments about AIPAC and then claimed that "Palestine does not exist". This resulted in protests outside Yeger's office in Boro Park. He was later removed from the Council's immigration committee. 

On October 30, 2022, Yeger tweeted a video of a swarm of bikers taking over a New York City street, Yeger compared these bikers to cockroaches saying, "Like cockroaches, there's never just one". Yeger received major backlash as a result with many calling the tweet racist pointing out that a majority of the bikers were black and brown. He subsequently deleted the tweet that same day.

References

External links
 Official website

Living people
Politicians from Brooklyn
American Orthodox Jews
New York (state) Democrats
New York City Council members
Jewish American people in New York (state) politics
21st-century American politicians
New York Law School alumni
Touro College alumni
New York (state) lawyers
1974 births
21st-century American Jews